Archaic Volumes is the seventh album from Fatso Jetson, released on April 3, 2010 by Cobraside.

Track listing

Personnel 
 Mario Lalli – guitar, vocals
 Tony Tornay – drums
 Larry Lalli – bass
Additional musicians
 Vince Meghrouni – harmonica, saxophone, vocals
 Mathias Schneeburger – organ, piano
 Gene Trautmann – drums (Track 10)
 Dino von Lalli – guitar (Track 9)

Credits
Music By, Words By – Fatso Jetson (tracks: 1 to 8, 10), Mario Lalli (tracks: 1 to 8, 10)

Recorded & Mixed at Donner & Blitzen, Silver Lake, California

Produced by Mathias Schneeberger & Fatso Jetson

References

2010 albums
Fatso Jetson albums